Colvig Gulch is a valley in the U.S. state of Oregon.

Colvig Gulch was named in the 1860s after one Dr. William L. Colvig.

References

Landforms of Jackson County, Oregon
Valleys of Oregon